is a railway station located in the town of Fukaura, Aomori Prefecture Japan, operated by the East Japan Railway Company (JR East).

Lines

Station layout
Jūniko  Station has one ground-level side platform serving a single bi-directional track. The station is unattended, and is managed from Goshogawara Station. The current station building was built by former Iwasaki Village to encourage tourism to the Jūniko Lakes.

History
Jūniko Station was opened on September 15, 1959 as the Jūniko Signal Stop.  With the privatization of the Japanese National Railways on April 1, 1987, it came under the operational control of JR East, and was elevated in status to that of a full station; however, initially only the Rapid Resort Shirakami stopped at the station. As of February 1, 1988 all normal local trains began to serve the station. The station building was completed on March 19, 2005.

Surrounding area

 Jūniko Lakes in the Tsugaru Quasi-National Park.

See also
 List of Railway Stations in Japan

References

External links

  

Stations of East Japan Railway Company
Railway stations in Aomori Prefecture
Gonō Line
Fukaura, Aomori
Railway stations in Japan opened in 1959